The men's hammer throw event at the 2007 Summer Universiade was held on 14 August.

Results

References
Results
Final results

Hammer
2007